Lincoln Theater Napa Valley in Yountville, California, on the grounds of the California Veterans Home in Napa County, California.  The 1214-seat theater is the performance venue  of the Napa Regional Dance Company and home of Symphony Napa Valley.  Originally opened in 1957, it underwent a  $20 million restoration which was completed in 2005.  Robert Mondavi, his wife Margrit, Ron W. Miller and his wife Diane were among the primary benefactors of the restoration project.  The State of California also provided $1.5 million in funding.  Singer Dianne Reeves headlined the opening performance following the restoration on January 8, 2005.  Centrally located on the 900-acre site of the nation's oldest Veteran's Home, the Napa Valley Performing Arts Center has a unique role to play in the artistic and cultural life of the Napa Valley. In 2005 the community came together to upgrade and renovate this very special space, creating what is now the largest venue in the Napa Valley with state of the art technical and performance capabilities. As exciting as this transformation has been, there have been challenges as well.

In August 2011, the theater's largest financial donor and key board member, Don Carr, was killed in an auto accident.  The sudden loss of financial and leadership support, on the heels of the fiscal problems posed by the 2008 economic downturn, created a serious threat to the theater's long term viability. Within a few months, it became clear that the only way to ensure the health and vitality of the theater was to undergo a thorough strategic and financial restructuring process. The restructuring was a success. Within 11 months, the newly named Napa Valley Performing Arts Center at Lincoln Theater opened, debt free and with a new board, a stronger community focus, and a diversified donor base. The Performing Arts Center has since emerged as a leading provider of cultural programming and arts education in Napa County.

References

External links 
 Lincoln Theater Homepage

Performing arts centers in California
Yountville, California
Buildings and structures in Napa County, California
Theatres in the San Francisco Bay Area
Music venues in California
Dance venues in the United States
Tourist attractions in Napa County, California
Theatres completed in 1957
1957 establishments in California